Bronchocela marmorata, marbled crested lizard, marbled bloodsucker or marbled agamid lizard is a species of lizard. It is endemic to the Philippines, where it inhabits lowland dipterocarp and montane forests at elevations 400 to 800 m above mean sea level. It is typically found on branches and leaves of trees. It feeds on insects and is oviparous, digging the soil to lay its eggs at the base of trees.

References 

Bronchocela
Reptiles described in 1845
Taxa named by John Edward Gray
Reptiles of the Philippines